Dasyvesica lophotalis is a species of snout moth in the genus Dasyvesica. It is found in Jamaica and Costa Rica.

References

Moths described in 1906
Epipaschiinae